The Belgian International is an international badminton open tournament, held since 1958 but in irregular periods.

Since 2005, Yonex has become title sponsor of the event, which also become an International Challenge tournament within the Badminton Europe tournament circuit.

Previous winners

Performances by nation

References

External links
Official website

Badminton tournaments in Belgium
International sports competitions hosted by Belgium
Recurring sporting events established in 1958
1958 establishments in Belgium